Major Sir Hamish Stewart Forbes, 7th Baronet, MBE, MC, KStJ (15 February 1916 – 3 September 2007) was a British Army officer who served in the Welsh Guards in World War II, spending over five years in German custody as a prisoner of war. In later life, he was patron of the Lonach Highland and Friendly Society from 1984 until his death.

Early life
Forbes was born in London. He was the second son of Lieutenant Colonel James Forbes and his wife, Feridah Taylor. He was educated at Eton College, at Lawrenceville School in the United States, and at the School of Oriental and African Studies in London.

Before World War II, he worked for health salts manufacturer Eno and for sugar broker Czarnikow.

Military career
Forbes was commissioned as a subaltern in the 1st Welsh Guards in 1939.  After a short period in Gibraltar, he served as battalion intelligence officer in the British Expeditionary Force in France in 1940. Leading a reconnaissance patrol near Arras in May 1940, he was captured by the Germans. He was later awarded the Military Cross for his conduct.

He was held in a series of German prisoner-of-war camps until the end of the war, but was involved in at least 10 attempts to escape from the four prisoner of war camps in which he was detained. He and six others escaped from Oflag IX-A/Z at Rotenburg. He was quickly recaptured and jailed. He was involved in three attempts to escape from Oflag VII-C at Laufen, and three further attempts at Oflag VI-B at Dössel (now part of Warburg).

He was moved to Oflag VII-B at Eichstätt then back to Oflag IX-A/Z, where another escape bought him eight days of liberty. Recaptured and marched west with other prisoners to prevent being released by the advancing Red Army, he slipped out of the column and managed to reach forward units of the advancing First United States Army, and was quickly returned to England.

His escape attempts led to a mention in dispatches in 1945, upgraded to an MBE (Military Division).

He continued to serve in the Welsh Guards after the war, in England, Germany and with CENTO forces in Turkey. He retired from the Army as a major in 1958.

Later life
After leaving the British Army, he worked for Calmic Chemicals, Gillette and Shell-Mex & BP until 1964. He was also an amateur painter and sculptor. He retired to Strathdon in Aberdeenshire.

Affiliations
He was secretary of the Order of St John from 1973 to 1983, and president of the Church Lads' and Church Girls' Brigade Association from 1974 to 2000. He succeeded his third cousin, Colonel Sir John Stewart Forbes, to be the 7th Baronet in 1984, and also became patron of the Lonach Highland Society that year.

The Society was founded in 1822 by his ancestor Sir Charles Forbes, the 1st Baronet, to preserve and promote Highland culture and the Scottish Gaelic language.

Personal life
He married twice. He married Jacynthe Underwood in 1945, and they had a son and three daughters. They divorced in 1981. He remarried later that same year, to Mary Christine Rigby (MBE).

Death
He died in Aberdeen, Scotland and was survived by his second wife, and son and daughters from his first marriage. His son, James, succeeded him as 8th Baronet.

References

Sources
Obituary, The Times, 20 September 2007
Obituary, The Herald, 20 September 2007
 Obituary, The Daily Telegraph, 28 September 2007
Obituary, The Herald, 6 September 2007

1916 births
2007 deaths
Baronets in the Baronetage of the United Kingdom
Welsh Guards officers
British Army personnel of World War II
World War II prisoners of war held by Germany
People educated at Eton College
Members of the Order of the British Empire
Recipients of the Military Cross
Knights of the Order of St John
Lawrenceville School alumni